Mia Lyhne (born 6 July 1971) is a Danish film and television actress. She came to the attention of a wider public after her participation in the 2005 first season of the Danish version of Dancing with the Stars, but she is probably best known for her role on the 2005-2009 Danish sitcom Klovn, playing Mia, the girlfriend of comedian Frank Hvam.

Career 
A self-taught actress, Lyhne began her TV career with small roles, including a segment in the Dansk Melodi Grand Prix 2004 in which she portrayed a very geeky Eurovision fanatic.

Lyhne has landed several movie and television roles since then, including one in Lars von Trier's Direktøren for det Hele (The Boss of it All), one of the lead characters in the Danish sitcom Trio Van Gogh, and a role in the Danish adaptation of the play Who's Afraid of Virginia Woolf?, with Nikolaj Lie Kaas.
 
In the broadcast of TV 2's Zulu Awards 2012, Lyhne presented the award for the Best Film of the Year, joined by her Klovn co-star Casper Christensen, who presented the Best Live Performance of the Year prize.

Filmography 

|-  style="text-align:center; ;"
|  style="border-style:none none solid solid; "|Film Title
|  style="border-style:none none solid solid; "|Role
|  style="border-style:none none solid solid; "|Year
|- align=center
| align=left| Sover Dolly på ryggen   (post-production) || || align=left|2012
|- align=center
| align=left|Lærkevej - til døden os skiller  || align=left|Karina || align=left|2012
|- align=center
| align=left| Klown (Danish: Klovn - The Movie) || align=left|Mia || align=left|2012
|- align=center
| align=left| Hash   (video) || align=left| Christians mor/Majorens kone (voice) || align=left|2010
|- align=center
| align=left| Smukke mennesker  || align=left|Vivian || align=left|2010
|- align=center
| align=left|Camping  || align=left| Connie Nielsen || align=left|2009
|- align=center
| align=left|Blå mænd  || align=left| Karen - AF dame || align=left|2008
|- align=center
| align=left|Hjemve  || align=left|Ulla || align=left|2007
|- align=center
| align=left|Den sorte Madonna  || align=left|Liz || align=left|2007
|- align=center
| align=left|Fidibus  || align=left| Sidse || align=left|2006
|- align=center
| align=left| Direktøren for det hele  || align=left| Heidi A. || align=left|2006
|- align=center
| align=left|Familien Gregersen  || align=left| || align=left|2004
|- align=center
| align=left|Forbrydelser  || align=left|Tina || align=left|2004
|- align=center
| align=left|De grønne slagtere  || align=left| Journalist || align=left|2003
|- align=center
| align=left|Vildfarelser  (Short Film) || align=left|Annabel || align=left|1998
|- align=center

Television 

|-  style="text-align:center; ;"
|  style="border-style:none none solid solid; "|TV Show Title
|  style="border-style:none none solid solid; "|Role
|  style="border-style:none none solid solid; "|Year
|- align=center
| align=left|A-klassen  || align=left| Camilla Nielsen / Camilla || align=left|2012
|- align=center
| align=left|4x1  || align=left|Connie || align=left|2011
|- align=center
| align=left|Hjælp, det er jul  || align=left|Birthe || align=left|2011
|- align=center
| align=left|Klovn  || align=left|Mia || align=left|2005–2018
|- align=center
| align=left|Album  || align=left|Katja Rolsted || align=left|2008
|- align=center
| align=left|Trio Van Gogh  || align=left|Anette || align=left|2007
|- align=center
| align=left|Krøniken  || align=left| Lisbet Knudsen || align=left|2005
|- align=center
| align=left|Er du skidt, skat?  || align=left|Lisetta Antonbergsdöttir, dokumentarist || align=left|2003
|- align=center
| align=left|Udvidelse af kampzonen  || align=left|Catherine || align=left|2002
|- align=center
| align=left|Perforama  || align=left|Charlotte || align=left|2002
|- align=center
| align=left|Kaos i opgangen  || align=left|Servetrice || align=left|1997
|- align=center

References

1971 births
Danish television actresses
Danish film actresses
Actresses from Copenhagen
Living people